Cheo Hodari Coker (born December 12, 1972) is an American former music journalist turned television writer and producer known for such television series as Luke Cage, NCIS: Los Angeles, Southland and Ray Donovan. Coker also wrote the screenplay for the 2009 biographical film Notorious, based on the life and death of The Notorious B.I.G.

Filmography

Television

Film

References

External links
 
 

Living people
American television producers
American screenwriters
African-American screenwriters
African-American television producers
American television writers
Showrunners
American male journalists
1972 births
21st-century African-American people
20th-century African-American people